Lake Burrendong is a man-made reservoir created by Burrendong Dam. It impounds waters on the Macquarie and Cudgegong rivers, near Wellington, in the central west region of New South Wales, Australia.

Location and features

History 
In 2019 during a drought, the lake dried up and the former town that was inundated became visible again.

References

Further reading
 Kingsford, R.T. & Thomas, R. F. in press, The Macquarie Marshes in Arid Australia and its Waterbirds: a 50 Year History of Decline, in press, Environmental Management 19

Reservoirs in New South Wales